John Croke may refer to:

John Croke (died 1620), English lawyer and Speaker
John Croke (1508/9–49/51), MP for Hindon
John Croke (died c. 1600), MP for Southampton
John Croke (died 1640), English politician, MP for Oxfordshire and for Shaftesbury

See also
Croke baronets